Lyonetia castaneella is a moth in the Lyonetiidae family. It is found in Russia (the southern part of Primorskii Territory) and Japan.

The wingspan is 6.5–7 mm. There are two distinct forms, an aestival (summer) and autumnal form. The forewing of the aestival form is white, that of the autumnal form golden yellow. Adults are on wing from July to August in the southern part of the Primorskii Territory.

The larvae feed on Alnus japonica, Castanea cretata and Quercus acutissima. They mine the leaves of their host plant. The mine has the form of an irregular blotch mine. It is made on a young leaf and extends from the apex of the leaf towards the base in an irregular blotch along the margin of the leaf. The blackish frass is ejected from the holes which are made on the lower side of the mine, but some is scattered in the mine. The larva may migrate from one leaf to another. When full-grown, the larva leaves the mine and spins a hammock-like cocoon on the lower side of the leaf.

External links
A Review of the Lyonetiid Moths (Lepidoptera, Lyonetiidae): II. The Subfamilies Lyonetiinae and Bedelliinae
Revisional Studies On The Family Lyonetiidae Of Japan (Lepidoptera)

Lyonetiidae
Moths of Japan